Jack McIver Weatherford is the former DeWitt Wallace Professor of anthropology at Macalester College in Minnesota. He is best known for his 2004 book, Genghis Khan and the Making of the Modern World. In 2006, he was awarded the Order of the Polar Star, and the Order of Chinggis Khan, Mongolia’s two highest national honors.

His books in the late 20th century on the influence of Native American cultures have been translated into numerous languages. In addition to publishing chapters and reviews in academic books and journals, Weatherford has published numerous articles in national newspapers to popularize his historic and anthropological coverage of Native American cultures, as well as the American political culture in Congress in the 20th century. He has become a frequent commentator on TV and radio.

Early life 

In 1946 Weatherford was born on a farm in Dovesville, South Carolina to Anna Ruth Grooms and Alfred Gregg Weatherford, as the oldest of seven children. His father fought in World War II, the Korean War, and the Vietnam War, and died from Agent Orange Disease with the rank of Sergeant.

Academic career 
In 1964, Weatherford graduated from Dreher High School with Walker Pearce to whom he was married from 1970 until her death from multiple sclerosis in 2013. After a graduate degree from the University of South Carolina, he earned his Ph.D. in anthropology from the University of California, San Diego with additional graduate work at Frankfurt University and Duke University. He worked as legislative assistant to Senator John Glenn and taught for twenty-nine years at Macalester College in Saint Paul, Minnesota, where he held the DeWitt Wallace Distinguished Chair of Anthropology.

His books include Indian Givers: How the Indians of the Americas Transformed the World (1988), which was translated into numerous languages; Native Roots: How the Indians Enriched America (1991), and Savages and Civilization: Who Will Survive? (1994) on the contemporary clash of world cultures.  Weatherford's early books on Native Americans won the Minnesota Book Award in 1989 and in 1992. He also received the 1992 Anthropology in the Media Award from the American Anthropological Association, and the 1994 Mass Media Award of the National Conference of Christians and Jews.

He became more widely known for his book, The History of Money (1997), which was chosen as a selection of the Conservative Book of the Month Club. In addition, Weatherford's articles about the anthropology of 20th-century American politics and analysis of its clans, have led to his being invited as a commentator on radio and television programs, including The Today Show, ABC Evening News with Peter Jennings, Geraldo's Now It Can Be Told, Larry King, All Things Considered, Nightwatch, Tony Brown's Journal, and the Voice of America. He has appeared in international programs from Bolivia to Mongolia.

Since the late twentieth century, Weatherford has studied and published on the cultures and history of Mongolia. His work has been recognized by that nation's government: in 2006, he was awarded the Order of the Polar Star, Mongolia's highest national honor. In addition, Weatherford was awarded the honorary order by the Ministry of Foreign Affairs of Mongolia and the medal of the President of Mongolia in 2010. 

In 2014 Bolivia honored him for this work on the indigenous people of the Americas with the Order of the Gran Mariscal de Ayacucho, Antonio José Sucre and named him Honorary Cultural Ambassador of Bolivia’s Casa de Libertad in the Constitutional Capital Sucre, and honorary citizen of Potosí. 

On 24 November 2022-Chinggis Khan's birthday celebration in Mongolia, the President of Mongolia awarded Chinggis Khan order to Jack Weatherford, making him the first foreign recipient of this prestigious award. 

He now lives at Tur Hurah on the Bogd Khan Mountain in Mongolia.

Interests 
Weatherford has worked with contemporary groups in places such as Bolivia and the Amazon. He has also worked with historical analysis such as the impact of the American Indians on world history. In recent years, he has concentrated on the Mongols by looking at their impact since the time that Genghis Khan united the Mongol tribes in 1206.

Publications

Books 
 2016 Genghis Khan and the Quest for God: How the World's Greatest Conqueror Gave Us Religious Freedom : Viking, 2016. 
 2010 The Secret History of the Mongol Queens: How the Daughters of Genghis Khan Rescued His Empire : Crown, 2010. 
 2004 Genghis Khan and the Making of the Modern World New York: Crown Publishers
 1997 The History of Money. New York: Crown Publishers.
 1994 Savages and Civilization: Who Will Survive? New York: Crown Publishers.
 1991 Native Roots: How the Indians Enriched America. New York: Crown Publishers. 
 1988 Indian Givers: How the Indians of the Americas Transformed the World
 1987 Narcoticos en Bolivia y los Estados Unidos. La Paz, Bolivia: Los Amigos del Libro.
 1986 Porn Row. New York: Arbor House. 
 1981 Tribes on the Hill. New York: Rawson-Wade (Scribners).

References

External links 
 
 Jack Weatherford Foundation
 

Year of birth missing (living people)
Mongolists
Historians of Mongolia
American ethnographers
American anthropologists
Macalester College faculty
Writers from Columbia, South Carolina
University of South Carolina alumni
Duke University alumni
Living people